Sarchi may refer to
 Sarchi, Kurdistan, village in Gavrud Rural District, Kurdistan Province, Iran
 Sarchi (surname), surname

See also 

 Sarchí (disambiguation)